Choya (Çoo) is a rural locality (a selo) and the administrative center of Choysky District of the Altai Republic, Russia. Population:

References

Notes

Sources

Rural localities in Choysky District